The Hartley Building is a historic office building in Duluth, Minnesota, United States.  It was designed by architect Bertram Goodhue of New York City and built in 1914.  The Hartley Building was listed on the National Register of Historic Places in 1989 for having local significance in the theme of architecture.  It was nominated for its exemplary Tudor Revival architecture and its status as one of four local buildings designed by Goodhue, the only nationally recognized architect to produce multiple commissions in early Duluth.

Goodhue's other Duluth works are the Kitchi Gammi Club (1912), St. Paul's Episcopal Church (1912), and the Cavour Hartley House (1915).

See also
 National Register of Historic Places listings in St. Louis County, Minnesota

References

1914 establishments in Minnesota
Buildings and structures in Duluth, Minnesota
Commercial buildings completed in 1914
National Register of Historic Places in St. Louis County, Minnesota
Office buildings on the National Register of Historic Places in Minnesota
Tudor Revival architecture in Minnesota